Kildeer Countryside Community Consolidated School District 96 is a K-8 school district centered in the Lake County village of Long Grove, Illinois, a suburb of Chicago. This district is composed of seven schools in total, or one kindergarten center, four elementary schools, and two middle schools; any students attending District 96 will ultimately attend Adlai E. Stevenson High School in Lincolnshire, Illinois. This district's kindergarten center is known as Willow Grove Early Learning Center which, as its name suggests, serves kindergarteners and early childhood students. Ivy Hall Elementary School educates those in and within grades one and five; Prairie Elementary School and Country Meadows Elementary School do exactly the same. Kildeer Countryside Elementary School, the largest of the schools in terms of the student body, also serves all grades between one and five. Woodlawn Middle School and Twin Groves Middle School provide the next level of education, serving grades 6-8. As mentioned before, all students from this point on move forward to Stevenson High School District 125 for their last leg of precollegiate education. The school superintendent is Mrs. Kathryn E. Sheridan. The mascot of Woodlawn Middle School is the wolf, while the mascot of Twin Grove Middle School is the colt; in the elementary schools, the cougar is the mascot of Kildeer Elementary, the wildcat is the mascot of Ivy Hall Elementary, the cub is the mascot of Country Meadows Elementary, and the puma  is the mascot of Prairie Elementary.

In March 2007, five District 96 schools were elected by the Chicago Sun-Times as five of fifty of the best suburban schools in Chicago metropolitan area: Ivy Hall Elementary School, Prairie Elementary School, Kildeer Countryside Elementary School, Twin Groves Middle School, and Woodlawn Middle School. The former three listed were chosen as some of the fifteen best public schools in the county by Chicago Magazine in October 2006. In October 2007, Twin Groves was also certified as an official Blue Ribbon school. Woodlawn Middle School, in the 2009- 2010 school year, also got a Blue Ribbon Award. Also, during the 2012-2013 school year, Kildeer Countryside Elementary School received a Blue Ribbon award.

History
The district was formed in the wake of World War II in 1946. Four one-room schoolhouses in the then-rural southern Lake County area that initially served as independent districts were consolidated into one.

Up to 1999, students in District 96 attended one of three elementary schools, Prairie, Kildeer, or Willow Grove, before graduating and converging into Ivy Hall Middle School (5-6) and Twin Groves Junior High (7-8) for their last four years in the district. At this time, however, the school district worked to expand its capacity and therefore constructed the newer Woodlawn Middle School, as well as the Country Meadows Elementary School. A reorganization effort also designated another structure as part of the district to educate kindergarteners; this separate building is now known as Willow Grove Early Learning Center.

Since 1993, four school referendums have been passed; three pertain to the money that fueled the construction and additions of the Woodlawn, Country Meadows, and Willow Grove facilities, while the other referendum involved a separate fund to improve the schools already in the district. This referendum, alongside contributions by school-localized Parent-Teacher Organizations, have made possible a purchase of new learning apparatus that can be utilized for the students' benefit.

The Schools Currently
Of the schools now, they consist of one Kindergarten & Early Childhood Center, Willow Grove, four 1-5 Elementary Schools and two 6-8 Middle Schools. Ivy Hall and Prairie are K-5 schools that converge into Twin Groves now 6-8, as they are located in Buffalo Grove, and Kildeer Countryside and Country Meadows are K-5 schools that converge into Woodlawn Middle School 6-8, as they are all located in Long Grove. All of these schools, converge into Adlai E. Stevenson High School.

List of Principals
Jennifer Smith of Willow Grove Early Learning Center 
Mike Senatore of Ivy Hall Elementary School 
Christine Pfaff of Prairie Elementary School 
Michelle Garlick of Country Meadows Elementary School 
Karen L. Cumpata of Kildeer Countryside Elementary School 
Jessica Barnes of Twin Groves Middle School 
Gregory Grana of Woodlawn Middle School

External links
Kildeer Countryside Community Consolidated School District 96 Home Page

References

School districts in Lake County, Illinois
Buffalo Grove, Illinois
1946 establishments in Illinois
School districts established in 1946